Reguły Gry (Rules of the Game) is a Polish sitcom directed by Bartłomiej Ignaciuk that premiered on TVN 7 on 16 February 2012.  The filming began on 4 December 2011. The series is based on American format Rules of Engagement.

In April 2012, Reguły Gry was renewed for a second series. Filming was to begin in June and broadcast was set to start in September 2012. However, in June 2012 production of the second series was halted due to advertisement market crisis.

Plot
The series follows the story of five friends: a newly engaged couple - Natasza and Adam (Julia Kamińska and Maciej Zakościelny), a long-married couple - Magda and Grzegorz (Katarzyna Kwiatkowska and Jan Jankowski) and their still-single friend - Jacek (Paweł Wilczak).

Cast
 Julia Kamińska as Natasza
 Maciej Zakościelny as Adam
 Katarzyna Kwiatkowska as Magda
 Jan Jankowski as Grzegorz
 Paweł Wilczak as Jacek

Episodes

Ratings
Reguły Gry premiered on TVN 7 on 16 February 2012 at 8:00 p.m. and attracted the audience of 371,978 viewers.

References

External links
Official site
Reguły Gry at Filmweb.pl

Polish television sitcoms
Polish television series based on American television series
2012 Polish television series endings
2012 Polish television series debuts
2010s Polish television series
Casual sex in television
TVN (Polish TV channel) original programming
Polish-language television shows
Narcissism in television
Television series about couples
Television series about marriage
Television series by CBS Studios
Television series by Sony Pictures Television